RVE may refer to:

 Radicalization into violent extremism
 Remote Video Encoding 
 Representative volume element
 Rotavirus E